Vitalii Hryhorovych Radetskyi (born January 1, 1944, Khrystynivka, Cherkasy Oblast, Ukrainian SSR) is a Ukrainian military, General of the Army who served as the Minister of Defence and chief of the National University of Defense of Ukraine. He also was the last commander of the Odesa Military District when it was transformed into the Southern Operational Command.

External links 
 Biography

1944 births
Living people
People from Khrystynivka
Generals of the Army (Ukraine)
Defence ministers of Ukraine
Frunze Military Academy alumni
Military Academy of the General Staff of the Armed Forces of the Soviet Union alumni
Recipients of the Order of Bohdan Khmelnytsky, 1st class
Recipients of the Order of Bohdan Khmelnytsky, 2nd class
Recipients of the Order of Bohdan Khmelnytsky, 3rd class